"I Take the Chance" is a song written by The Louvin Brothers, which was released in 1956 by The Browns. The song spent 21 weeks on the Billboard survey of "Most Played C&W by Jockeys", reaching No. 2, while spending 24 weeks on the Billboard survey of "C&W Best Sellers in Stores", reaching No. 6, and reaching No. 9 on the Billboard survey of "Most Played C&W in Juke Boxes".

Chart performance

Cover versions
Ernest Ashworth released a cover of the song in 1962, which reached No. 7 on the Billboard "Hot Country Singles" chart.

References

1956 songs
1956 singles
The Browns songs
Ernest Ashworth songs
Songs written by Charlie Louvin
Songs written by Ira Louvin
RCA Victor singles